Chloropicus is a genus of birds in the woodpecker family Picidae that are native to Sub-Saharan Africa.

Taxonomy
The genus was introduced by the French ornithologist Alfred Malherbe in 1845 with the fire-bellied woodpecker (Chloropicus pyrrhogaster) as the type species. The word Chloropicus is from the Greek khlōros meaning green and pikos meaning woodpecker. Molecular genetic studies have shown that the genus Chloropicus is sister to the genus Dendropicos. Species in this genus were previously sometimes assigned to Dendropicos.

The genus contains the three species:

References

 
Bird genera
 
Taxa named by Alfred Malherbe